Rogen–Franco refers to the collaboration between the actors:
Seth Rogen
James Franco